Vinicka is a village in the municipality of Prijepolje, Serbia. According to the 2002 census, the village has a population of 474 people.

References

Populated places in Zlatibor District